Herder–farmer conflicts in Nigeria are a series of disputes over arable land resources across Nigeria between mostly Muslim Fulani herders and mostly Christian non-Fulani farmers. They have been especially prominent in the Middle Belt (North Central) since the return of democracy in 1999. More recently, it has deteriorated into attacks on farmers by Fulani herdsmen.

Attacks have also taken place in the northwest Nigeria against farmers who are mainly Hausa. While the conflict has underlying economic and environmental reasons, it has also acquired religious and ethnic dimensions. Thousands of people have died since these attacks began. Sedentary farming in rural communities are often target of attacks because of their vulnerability. There are fears that this conflict will spread to other West African countries but this has often been downplayed by governments in the region. Attacks on herders have also led them to retaliating by attacking other communities.

The conflict has been labeled a genocide of Christians by several Christian and Nigerian sources.

Background 
Herder-farmer conflicts in Nigeria have deep roots and date back to pre-colonial times (before the 1900s). However, these conflicts have become far more severe in recent decades due to population pressures, climate change, and various other factors. During the British colonial era, herders and farmers would agree on a system called burti, in which specific migration routes were set up for herders, with mutual agreement from the farmers, herders, and local authorities. However, the burti system collapsed around the 1970s when farmers increasingly claimed ownership of lands along cattle migration paths, increasingly leading to conflicts.

Before, herders frequently exchanged milk for cereal grains with farming communities. However, in recent decades, milk is no longer being widely bartered as packaged beverages became more popular in towns.

Modern medicines have also made it possible for herders to move their livestock further south into the "tsetse fly zone" in the south, whereas before, herders could not keep their cattle on a large scale due to tropical diseases in humid climate zones. Starting from those implemented by the British colonial administration, tsetse control programs have reduced the threat of diseases such as trypanosomiasis. Today, herders also have easy access to drugs for trypanosomiasis and dermatophilosis in order to keep their livestock alive. In addition, over the past several decades, herders have cross-bred trypanosome-intolerant zebu cattle with trypanosome-tolerant  humpless breeds, thereby increasing the cattle's tolerance of tropical diseases. All of these factors have enabled the widespread migration of Fulani herders into the southernmost areas of Nigeria, where they could easily sell their livestock for higher prices due to strong demand for beef and other meat products in Nigeria's populous southern towns and cities. However, in the south, they would encounter sedentary communities that have not historically had any experience with peacefully negotiating and co-existing with nomadic herders. Increasing ease of access to weapons and religious polarisation among both Christians and Muslims have added to the potential for violence.

Since the Fourth Nigerian Republic's founding in 1999, farmer-herder violence has killed more than 19,000 people and displaced hundreds of thousands more. It followed a trend in the increase of farmer-herder conflicts throughout much of the western Sahel, due to an expansion of agriculturist population and cultivated land at the expense of pasturelands; deteriorating environmental conditions, desertification and soil degradation; population growth; breakdown in traditional conflict resolution mechanisms of land and water disputes; and proliferation of small arms and crime in rural areas. Insecurity and violence have led many populations to create self-defence forces and ethnic and tribal militias, which have engaged in further violence. The majority of farmer-herder clashes have occurred between Muslim Fulani herdsmen and farmers, exacerbating  hostilities.

Ethnic groups 
There are various pastoralist tribes in northern Nigeria that include not only Fulani people, but also Kanuri, Kanembu, Arab, and other groups. Blench (2010) lists the following pastoralist tribes in northern Nigeria.

Fulani herdsmen are represented by advocacy groups such as Miyetti Allah.

Farmers belong to diverse ethnic groups, primarily Hausa people and the diverse ethnic groups of the Middle Belt. In more recent years, this has also expanded to include southern Nigerian ethnic groups such as the Yoruba, Igbo, and others. Farmers belonging to various minority ethnic groups in the Middle Belt are represented by partisan advocacy groups such as CONAECDA.

Regional conflicts in Jos and Kaduna
The farmer/herder conflicts have been taking place in regions which have been unstable since the 2000s. Urban conflicts in Jos and Kaduna have been particularly violent and, despite violent clashes with the authorities, their causes have never been addressed politically. Conflicts might not have been addressed adequately because traditional authorities have not been fulfilling their role in colonial-era settlements.

Over time the periodic clashes between herders and farmers in Northern and North-Central Nigeria have precipitated a general climate of insecurity. This widespread insecurity both allows for and is perpetuated by acts of broader criminality, in which gangs of bandits target locations in the area for raids, mass kidnappings, and looting.

Causes of the conflict

Land conflicts
Conflicts between farmers and herders can be understood as a problem of access to land. The beginning of the 21st century witnessed an expansion of the agriculturist population and its cultivated land at the expense of pasturelands in the Middle Belt. In an already politically unstable region, it has never always been possible to ascertain a legal title to land for every farmer. As a result, transhumance routes of herders were no longer available, especially in a context of global warming.

Climatic crisis

Deteriorating environmental conditions, desertification and soil degradation have led Fulani herdsmen from Northern Nigeria to change their transhumance routes. Access to pastureland and watering points in the Middle Belt became essential for herdsmen travelling from the North of the country. It is often assumed that climate change is the driver of the conflict but recent study suggest that climate change does not automatically cause the conflict, but it has, however, changed the herders' migration pattern. Regions vulnerable to climate change (Northern Regions) experience less farmer-herder conflict and less intense farmer-herder fighting. It is argued that ethnic conflict between farming and herding groups need to be considered in the explanation of the mechanism of the climate change-farmer-herder conflict nexus.

Responses
The Nigerian government has been unwilling to address the causes of the crisis. Fighting Boko Haram in the North-East and facing rising levels of violence in different regions of the country, the government has nonetheless tried to implement a few measures.

Due to the widely perceived inefficacy of the Nigerian government, armed vigilante groups have sprung up in many farmer communities. This situation would often lead to vicious cycles of bloody feuds among farmers and herders. Local politicians and religious leaders have also exacerbated conflicts by recruiting members and frequently exaggerating claims.

Since 2012, there have been projects to create transhumance corridors through the Middle Belt. Mostly supported by Northern lawmakers and opposed by their Southern counterparts, these endeavours have been rarely successful.

In 2019, President Muhammadu Buhari tried to create Rural Grazing Area (RUGA) settlements. His proposal was met with fierce criticism. On 17 May 2021, the 17 Southern governors in Nigeria issued the Asaba Declaration, aimed at solving the crisis.

Although ranching, where cattle are kept in enclosed parcels of land, has frequently been proposed as a solution to the crisis, this has proven to be highly unfeasible in Nigeria due to poor infrastructure (with unstable supplies of electricity, water, and fuel) and difficulties with acquisition and legal ownership of land. Land grabbing and cattle rustling are also potential difficulties that ranchers would have to deal with. Ranchers would also be unable to compete with nomadic herders with zero land-related costs.

List of attacks

Nigerian and foreign newspapers are often unable to provide exact numbers of casualties. Despite the high number of attacks, Nigerian and foreign journalists rarely have access to first-hand testimonies and tend to report inaccurate figures.
 According to the Global Terrorism Index, these conflicts resulted in over 800 deaths by 2015.
 The year 2016 saw further incidents in Agatu, Benue and Nimbo, Enugu State.
 In April 2018, Fulani gunmen allegedly killed 19 people during an attack on the church, afterwards they burnt dozens of nearby homes.
 In January 2018, about 10 persons were killed in an attack and reprisal involving herders and local farmers in Numan local council of Adamawa State.
 In May 2018 over 400 herdsmen attacked four villages of Lamurde, Bang, Bolk,  Zumoso and Gon in Numan and Lamurde local councils of Adamawa State killing 15 people.
 In June 2018, over 200 people were killed and 50 houses were burnt in clashes between farmers and Fulani cattle herders in Plateau State, including one devastating attack from the night of the 22nd to the morning of the 23rd which killed 21 villagers in the village of Dowaya, Adamawa state. The casualties were reported to only consist of women and children.
 In July 2018, a clash erupted between the Fulani settlers and the Yandang community in Lau Local Government Area of Taraba State. About 73 people were killed and 50 villages were razed.
 In October 2018, Fulani herdsmen killed at least 19 people in Bassa.
 On 16 December 2018, militants believed to be Fulani herdsmen attacked a village in Jema'a, killing 15 people and injuring at least 24 others, the attack occurred at a wedding ceremony.
 On 11 February 2019, an attack on an Adara settlement named Ungwar Bardi by suspected Fulani gunmen killed 11. Reprisal attack by Adara targeted settlements of the Fulani killing at least 141 people with 65 missing. The attacks took place in Kajuru LGA of Kaduna State. According to a governor the motive was to destroy specific communities.
 The Coalition Against Kajuru killings stated on 18 March 2019 that 130 people have been killed in a series of revenge attacks since the massacre announced by El-Rufai.
 On January 26 and 27 of 2020, 32 villagers were murdered in two different attacks by Muslim Fulani herdsmen in Plateau State.
 On April 12 of 2022, 23 were killed in an attack by herdsman against the Mbadwem (Guma local government area) and Tiortyu (Tarka local government area) communities.

See also
 List of massacres in Nigeria
 Communal conflicts in Nigeria
 Fulani herdsmen
 Sudanese nomadic conflicts
 March 2019 attacks against Fulani herders
 2019 Kaduna State massacre
 Nimbo massacre
 Agatu massacres
 Janjawid
 Agricultural sustainability in northern Nigeria
 Southern Kaduna Crisis
 Asaba Declaration
 Fulani extremism
 Fulani extremism in Nigeria

Bibliography
 Adebanwi, Wale, 'Terror, Territoriality and the Struggle for Indigeneity and Citizenship in Northern Nigeria', Citizenship Studies, 13.4 (2009), 349–63
 Amnesty International, Harvest of Death: Three Years of Bloody Clashes between Farmers and Herders in Nigeria, 2018 <>
 Bearak, Max, Jane Hahn, Mia Torres, and Olivier Laurent, 'The Ordinary People Keeping the Peace in Nigeria's Farmer-Herder Conflict', The Washington Post, 10 December 2018 <The ordinary people keeping the peace in Nigeria's deadly land feuds> [accessed 25 December 2019]
 Blench, Roger. 1996. Pastoralists and National Borders in Nigeria. In: Nugent, P., and A. I. Asiwaju (eds). African Boundaries: Barriers, conduits and opportunities. 111–128. Edinburgh: Francis Pinter for Centre of African Studies.
 Blench, Roger. 2001. Pastoralism in the new millennium. FAO: Animal Health and Production Series, No 150.
 Blench, Roger. 2003. The transformation of conflict between pastoralists and cultivators in Nigeria. Paper in press for a special issue of the Journal Africa, ed. M. Moritz.
 Blench, Roger. 2010. Conflict between pastoralists and cultivators in Nigeria. Review paper prepared for the Department for International Development (DFID), Nigeria.
 Blench, Roger. 2017. Is fencing a solution to reducing herder-farmer conflict in Nigeria?. Field investigations on pastoralist-farmers crises areas and enhancement of MISEREOR's partnersinterventions in Nigeria, Phase 3. Draft prepared for ISEREOR/JDPs.
 Blench, Roger. 2017. Pastoral conflict and supplying Nigeria with meat: how can the paradox be resolved.  Field investigations on pastoralist-farmers crises areas and enhancement of MISEREOR's partnersinterventions in Nigeria, Phase 3. Revised paper prepared for ISEREOR/JDPs.
 Blench, Roger. 1984.  Conflict and co-operation: Fulani relations with the Samba and Mambila peoples. Cambridge Anthropology, 9(2):42-57. (2005 revision)
 Blench, Roger. 2005. Conflict and Co-operation: Fulɓe Relations with the Mambila and Samba people of Southern Adamawa. Paper in press for a special issue of Africa, ed. M. Moritz. Cambridge: Kay Williamson Education Foundation.
 Blench, Roger. 2003.  The transformation of conflict between pastoralists. Cambridge: Kay Williamson Education Foundation.
 Blench, Roger. 2016. The recent evolution of pastoralism in West-Central Africa. Cambridge: Kay Williamson Education Foundation.
 Porter, Gina; Fergus Lyon; Fatima Adamu; Lanre Obafemi; Roger Blench. 2005. Trade and Markets in Conflict Development and Conflict Resolution in Nigeria. Scoping study report to the UK Department for International Development.
 Blench, Roger. 2004. Natural Resource Conflicts in North-Central Nigeria: A Handbook and Case Studies. London/Abuja: Mandaras Press/DFID. (With integrated CD-ROM.)
 Blench, Roger. 1998. Resource conflict in semi-arid Africa: An essay and an annotated bibliography. ODI Research Study. ISBN 0-85003-343-8
 Blench, Roger. 2016. Accelerating pastoralist/farmer conflict across Central Nigeria (and West Africa) potentially compromises all IITA's goals. Talk given at IITA, Ibadan on 28 November 2016.
 Blench, Roger. 2016. The fire next time: the upsurge in civil insecurity across the Central Zone of Nigeria. Cambridge: Kay Williamson Educational Foundation.
 Higazi, Adam, 'Farmer-Pastoralist Conflicts on the Jos Plateau, Central Nigeria: Security Responses of Local Vigilantes and the Nigerian State', Conflict, Security and Development, 16.4 (2016), 365–85
 Last, Murray, 'Muslims and Christians in Nigeria: An Economy of Political Panic', The Round Table : The Commonwealth Journal of International Affairs, 96.392 (2007), 605–16
 Last, Murray, 'The Search for Security in Muslim Northern Nigeria', Africa, 78.1 (2008), 41–63
 Mustapha, Abdul Raufu, and David Ehrhardt, eds., Creed & Grievance: Muslim-Christian Relations & Conflict Resolution in Northern Nigeria (Oxford: James Currey, 2018)
 Ochonu, Moses E, 'Fulani Expansion and Subcolonial Rule in Early Colonial Adamawa Province', in Colonialism by Proxy Hausa Imperial Agents and Middle Belt Consciousness in Nigeria (Bloomington, IN: Indiana University Press, 2014), pp. 129–56
 Reynolds, Jonathan, The Time of Politics: Islam and the Politics of Legitimacy in Northern Nigeria 1950-1966 (San Francisco: International Scholar Publications, 1999)

References

Conflicts in 2022
Conflicts in Nigeria
Agriculture in Nigeria
21st-century mass murder in Nigeria
Violence in Nigeria
Middle Belt, Nigeria
Conflicts in 1998
Conflicts in 1999
Conflicts in 2000
Conflicts in 2001
Conflicts in 2002
Conflicts in 2003
Conflicts in 2004
Conflicts in 2005
Conflicts in 2006
Conflicts in 2007
Conflicts in 2008
Conflicts in 2009
Conflicts in 2010
Conflicts in 2011
Conflicts in 2012
Conflicts in 2013
Conflicts in 2014
Conflicts in 2015
Conflicts in 2016
Conflicts in 2017
Conflicts in 2018
Conflicts in 2019
Conflicts in 2020
Conflicts in 2021
Conflicts in 2023
1998 in Nigeria
1999 in Nigeria
2000 in Nigeria
2001 in Nigeria
2002 in Nigeria
2003 in Nigeria
2004 in Nigeria
2005 in Nigeria
2006 in Nigeria
2007 in Nigeria
2008 in Nigeria
2009 in Nigeria
2010 in Nigeria
2011 in Nigeria
2012 in Nigeria
2013 in Nigeria
2014 in Nigeria
2015 in Nigeria
2016 in Nigeria
2017 in Nigeria
2018 in Nigeria
2019 in Nigeria
2020 in Nigeria
2021 in Nigeria
2022 in Nigeria
2023 in Nigeria